Acharath Mackey (born in Tellicherry) was an Indian cricketer. He was a right-handed batsman and leg-break bowler who played for Travancore-Cochin.

Mackey made a single first-class appearance for the team, against Mysore. From the tailend, he scored 2 runs in the first innings in which he batted, and 17 runs in the second, as Travancore-Cochin lost the match by an innings margin.

External links
Acharath Mackey at Cricket Archive 

Indian cricketers
People from Thalassery
Travancore-Cochin cricketers
Cricketers from Kerala